R. Vishal Kumar (born 30 July 1992) is an Indian professional footballer who plays as a right back for Minerva Punjab in the I-League.

Club career

Early career
Born in Bangalore, Karnataka, it was in 2005 that football captured Vishal's imagination. The 8th standard student's enthusiasm caught the attention of Sports Authority of India coach Mary Victoria, who asked him to attend the beginners' camp at Nandan ground in Austin Town.

Later, she introduced him to veteran coach Dada Peer, who was in charge of the Department of Youth Services and Sports-run Sports School at Vidyanagar. "I failed in the selection trials. But Dada Peer Sir believed in my skills and ability and admitted me to the school," said Vishal.

During his term in Department of Youth Services and Sports-run Sports School, he failed to impress State coaches during the trials for Under-16 team. "I could not get a look in when I was in ninth standard. But I was not ready to give up. I attended the trials next year and won my place," he said.

The 29th edition of the sub-junior national championship for Mir Iqbal Hussain Trophy transformed his life forever. Karnataka's campaign ended in the semifinals, but the left wing back's career graph began to rise and he landed at the National camp in Gujarat.

A couple of days before the camp concluded, Vishal was forced to return to Bangalore with a broken left forearm, which he sustained during the late stages of a match while attempting a bicycle kick. "I was shattered as I could not complete the camp. I had almost put my national aspirations to rest. But I was surprised when the team's technical director Colm Toal took me into the national squad, even as I was recovering from the injury. It was a dream come true for me," said Vishal.

Now he carries Karnataka's football legacy at the national level, as he was the State's lone representative in the Indian probable list for the Olympic qualifiers against Qatar. He was also part of the Indian Arrows team that was formed with the main goal of nurturing young Indian football talents in the hope of qualifying for the 2018 World Cup in Russia

From then on, he was a regular in the India national under-16 football team and India national under-19 football team national squads and he figured in the 2012 AFC U-19 Championship qualification preliminary round matches in Saudi Arabia and the final round in Uzbekistan. He also traveled to Germany, England, USA and Bhutan on various exposure-cum-competition trips.

Indian Arrows
After playing a few matches for HAL Bangalore in the I-League 2nd Division, Vishal was selected to join the newly created Pailan Arrows (then AIFF XI) of the I-League, a team made up of entirely U21 players. On 3 December 2010, he made his I-League debut against United SC, which was also the AIFF XI's first ever I-League match as well, at the Salt Lake Stadium in Kolkata in which he started as the AIFF XI went down 2–1. He appeared in 17 league matches in the first season.

Bengaluru FC
After spending three seasons with the Pailan Arrows, Vishal signed with new direct-entry side Bengaluru FC for the 2013–14 season. He made his debut for the side in the club's I-League opener against Mohun Bagan A.C. on 22 September 2013 in which he started and played the full match as Bengaluru drew the match 1–1. The first goal scored by Bengaluru FC was by an assist from Vishal. He was released by the club in November 2016.

International
Vishal has represented India at the U16, U19, and U23 levels.

Career statistics

Awards

References

1992 births
Living people
Footballers from Bangalore
Indian footballers
Hindustan Aeronautics Limited S.C. players
Indian Arrows players
Bengaluru FC players
Association football defenders
I-League players
I-League 2nd Division players
India youth international footballers